Gaasbeek Castle is a castle located in Lennik, Flemish Brabant, Belgium. Nowadays, it serves as a national museum.

History 
The fortified castle was erected around 1240 to defend the Duchy of Brabant against the County of Flanders. The castle was destroyed however by Brussels city troops in revenge for the assassination of Everard t'Serclaes, which was allegedly commanded by the Lord of Gaasbeek at the time, Sweder of Abcoude.

At the beginning of the 16th century, the Dominium of Gaesbeeck was inherited by the House of Hornes; they constructed a brick castle on the ruins of the medieval fortress. In 1565, Lamoral, Count of Egmont, acquired the castle and its domain, including feudal rights in 17 surrounding villages. Accused of high treason by Philip II of Spain, the Count of Egmont was beheaded three years later on the Grand-Place/Grote Markt of Brussels.

In the following centuries, the castle was inhabited by several noble lords, amongst them René de Renesse, 1st Count of Warfusée, who acquired the castle and restored the buildings. It obtained its pseudo-medieval appearance as the result of a renovation during the years 1887–1898. The works were executed by the architect Charles Albert and ordered by the Marquis d'Arconati Visconti who owned the castle at that time. His widow Marie Peyrat donated the castle to the Belgian State, including the art collection and the grounds.

Museum 
Since 1980, the castle has been owned by the Flemish Community (Vlaamse Gemeenschap). The castle contains impressive art collections displayed in lavishly decorated historical rooms. A remarkable collection piece is the authentic testament of the famous painter Peter Paul Rubens
The castle and its grounds (a park of 50 hectares or 124 acres) are open to the public.

From 30 August 2020 to 2023, the castle museum is closed due to renovation works to the castle. The park and the museum garden remain accessible during this period.

Gallery

See also
List of castles in Belgium
Castle of Beersel

External links 
 Official website of Gaasbeek Castle

Gaasbeek
Gaasbeek Castle
Castles in Flemish Brabant
Historic house museums in Belgium
Parks in Belgium